Sisawa  is a village development committee in Nawalparasi District in the Lumbini Zone of southern Nepal. At the time of the 2001 Nepal census it had a population of 5890.

References

Populated places in Kapilvastu District